The Tarakai or Taraki is a Khilji Pashtun tribe; mainly found in the Ghazni province of Afghanistan. They are divided into several major clans/tribes: Nawrozkhel, Nakhel, Jamalkhel, Harunkhel, Malangkhel, Akhtarkhel, Daryakhel, Mullakhel, Lilizai, Mul, Gurbuz, Badin, Saki, and MurekKhel. These tribes are further divided into more sub-tribes within the above-mentioned clans/tribes.

The Tarakai were one of the Pashtun tribes resettled under the rule of king Abdur Rahman Khan in the late 19th century.

Notable people
 Nur Muhammad Tarakai, president of the communist Democratic Republic of Afghanistan from 1978 to 1979
 Najeeb Tarakai, a Cricketer on the Afghanistan national cricket team

References

Ghilji Pashtun tribes
Ethnic groups in Ghazni Province